Jeff Lastennet (born 26 August 1987 in Paris) is a French middle distance runner. He specializes in the 800 metres.

Achievements

References

1987 births
Living people
French male middle-distance runners
Athletes from Paris
Mediterranean Games silver medalists for France
Mediterranean Games medalists in athletics
Athletes (track and field) at the 2009 Mediterranean Games